Bijapur City Assembly constituency is one of 224 assembly constituencies of the Indian state of Karnataka. The constituency was previously known as Bijapur constituency which was readjusted in 2008 on the implementation of the Delimitation Commission of 2002. The constituency was a part of the Bombay State before the States Reorganisation Act, 1956. It is part of Bijapur (Lok Sabha constituency).

Members of Legislative Assembly

Election results

2018

2013

2008

Previous years 
For results before 2008, that is prior to the constituency readjustment  see Bijapur, Karnataka Assembly constituency.

References 

Assembly constituencies of Karnataka
Bijapur district, Karnataka